Tara is a genus of flowering plants in the legume family, Fabaceae. It belongs to the subfamily Caesalpinioideae.

Species
Tara comprises the following species:
 Tara cacalaco (Humb. & Bonpl.) Molinari & Sánchez Och.
 Tara spinosa (Feuillé ex Molina) Britton & Rose—Tara (Peru)

 Tara vesicaria (L.) Molinari, Sánchez Och. & Mayta

References

Caesalpinieae
Fabaceae genera